Nectandra gracilis is a species of plant in the family Lauraceae. It is found in Ecuador and Peru.

References

gracilis
Near threatened flora of South America
Trees of Ecuador
Trees of Peru